Olibrinidae is a family of crustaceans belonging to the order Isopoda.

Genera:
 Adoniscus Vandel, 1955
 Namboniscus Schmidt, 2001
 Namiboniscus Schmidt, 2001
 Olibrinus Budde-Lund, 1913
 Palaeolibrinus Broly, 2018
 Paradoniscus Taiti & Ferrara, 2004

References

Isopoda